In mathematics, a Q-category, introduced by Rosenberg in 1988, is a category that is a "milder version of a Grothendieck site." The Q stands for a quotient. The motivation for the notion was its use in noncommutative algebraic geometry; in this formalism, a noncommutative spaces are defined as sheaves on Q-categories.

References 

 Maxim Kontsevich, Alexander Rosenberg, Noncommutative spaces, preprint MPI-2004-35
 Alexander Rosenberg, Q-categories, sheaves and localization, (in Russian) Seminar on supermanifolds 25, Leites ed. Stockholms Universitet 1988.

Further reading 
 https://ncatlab.org/nlab/show/Q-category